Teil von mir ( Part of Me) is the third studio album by German singers Sarah and Pietro Lombardi. It was released by Kick Media Music on 18 May 2016 in German-speaking Europe.

Track listing

Charts

References

2016 albums
German-language albums
Pietro Lombardi (singer) albums
Sarah Lombardi albums
Collaborative albums